Banu Abd Shams refers to a clan within the Meccan tribe of Quraysh.

Ancestry
The clan names itself after Abd Shams ibn Abd Manaf, the son of Abd Manaf ibn Qusai and brother of Hashim ibn 'Abd Manaf, who was the great-grandfather of the Islamic prophet Muhammad. He married Layla bint Asad ibn Abdal-Uzza, she bore four sons, Habib, Rabi'a, Abd Al-Uzza, Umayya and one daughter, Ruqayyah.

Banu Rabi'ah 
Banu Rabi'ah was a branch that only had a few chiefs, they are:

1. Abu Hudhayfa Qays ibn 'Utba

2. Hind bint Utbah

3. Walid ibn Utbah

4. Utbah ibn Rabi'ah

5. Muhammad ibn Abi Hudhayfa

6. Shaybah ibn Rabi'ah

Connection with the Umayyads
The clan acts as the parent clan to Banu Umayya sub-clan, the widely known Umayyad dynasty who ruled as the second Islamic Caliphate (661–750) established after Muhammad's death. Umayya was the son of Abd Shams ibn Abd Manaf. In pre-Islamic Arabia, the clan's chieftain Utba ibn Rabi'ah's daughter Hind bint Utbah was married to Umayyad leader Abu Sufyan ibn Harb.

Modern day
The clan has its descendants living today in a few cities of Central and Western Arabia.

Members
The following were members.
Uthman, the third Muslim Caliph, son-in-law & close Companion (Sahabi) of Muhammad. Uthman was the direct member of Banu Abd-Shams tribe through Banu Umayya clan.
Arwa bint Kurayz, mother of caliph Uthman, female Companion & first cousin  of Muhammad.
Utbah ibn Rabi'ah, chieftain
Abu al-Aas ibn al-Rabee, companion and son-in-law of Muhammad and Khadija. Husband of Zainab bint Muhammad.
Umamah bint Abi al-As, grand daughter of Muhammad and Khadija. Wife of fourth Muslim caliph and first shia Imam Ali 
Walid ibn Utbah, son of Utbah
Hind bint Utbah, daughter of Utbah
Abu Hudhayfah ibn Utbah, son of Utbah and companion of Muhammad
Shaybah ibn Rabi'ah, brother of Utbah

See also
Banu Umayya
Battle of Uhud
Tribes of Arabia

References

Arab groups
Umayyad dynasty
AbdShams